Michael Andrew Smerconish (born March 15, 1962) is an American radio host and television presenter, political commentator, newspaper columnist, author, and lawyer. He broadcasts The Michael Smerconish Program weekdays at 9:00 a.m. ET on SiriusXM's POTUS Channel (124), and hosts the CNN and CNN International program Smerconish at 9:00 a.m. ET on Saturdays. He is a Sunday newspaper columnist for The Philadelphia Inquirer. Smerconish has written seven books: six non-fiction works and one novel. He is also of counsel to the Philadelphia law firm of Kline & Specter.

Early life and education 
Smerconish was born in Doylestown, Pennsylvania, the son of Florence (née Grovich) and Walter Smerconish. His family hails from Galicia in Eastern Europe, Montenegro, and Italy. He graduated from Central Bucks High School West, a public high school in Doylestown, Pennsylvania. He received his B.A. from Lehigh University and his Juris Doctor degree from the University of Pennsylvania Law School.

He has been awarded several honorary degrees: a Doctor of Humane Letters degree from Widener University on May 26, 2016, a Doctor of Humane Letters degree from Delaware Valley College on May 19, 2018, and a Doctor of Science degree from University of the Sciences on May 20, 2020.

Politics 

Smerconish was raised in a Republican household, and while in his early teens, Smerconish began to correspond with the then Democratic Mayor of Philadelphia, Frank L. Rizzo. Eventually the two would meet and establish a close relationship. But Smerconish's start in politics came in the spring of 1980 when his father competed unsuccessfully in a Republican primary for the Pennsylvania state legislature. Smerconish worked tirelessly in his father's campaign during his own senior year in high school, during which he registered to vote for the first time. Despite his father's election loss, Smerconish was smitten with GOP politics, having met both Ronald Reagan and George H. W. Bush during the build-up to the Pennsylvania Primary.

In 1980, Smerconish founded Lehigh University Youth for Reagan/Bush. While a full-time student at the University of Pennsylvania Law School, he ran for the Pennsylvania state legislature, losing the Republican Primary by 419 votes. After losing his primary, Smerconish continued at Penn Law, while working nearly full-time running political campaigns. In 1986, he was responsible for the City of Philadelphia in Senator Arlen Specter's re-election win, and in 1987, Smerconish served as Rizzo's Political Director in Rizzo's losing (Republican) bid to re-take City Hall. After graduating from Penn Law, he opened up a title insurance agency with his brother Wally, before being appointed, at age 29, by the administration of President George H.W. Bush to serve as the Department of Housing and Urban Development's Regional Administrator for Philadelphia Region III (consisting of Delaware, Maryland, Pennsylvania, Virginia, West Virginia, and the District of Columbia) under Secretary Jack Kemp.

After supporting only Republican presidential candidates for three decades, Smerconish publicly broke with the GOP and endorsed Barack Obama for president on October 19, 2008. In a 2,000-word essay for Salon titled "Why this lifelong Republican may vote for Obama," citing the Republican Party's failure to capture Osama bin Laden after seven years of war, he wrote, "All of this drives me bat-shit, and it just might drive me into the Obama camp. That'd be quite a departure."

He has urged the Republican Party to pursue "moderation on social issues in order to advance a suburban agenda for the GOP." Writing a 2010 op-ed for The Washington Post titled "On cable TV and talk radio, a push toward polarization," Smerconish said, "Buying gas or groceries or attending back-to-school nights, I speak to people for whom the issues are a mixed bag; they are liberal on some, conservative on others, middle of the road on the rest. But politicians don't take their cues from those people. No, politicians emulate the world of punditry."

On February 21, 2010, he announced in a newspaper column that he had left the Republican Party. Discussing Smerconish's move to the middle, Manuel Roig-Franzia of The Washington Post wrote, "It may be conventional wisdom that the only way to truly succeed in the world of talk is to occupy one of the poles. But Smerconish is betting his career that there's a great untapped center."

Smerconish voted for neither Hillary Clinton nor Donald Trump in the 2016 United States presidential election.

Legal 
Smerconish's tenure at HUD came to a close after George H.W. Bush was defeated by Bill Clinton in the 1992 election. In 1993, Smerconish began what would become a decade practicing law with legendary trial attorney James E. Beasley, who would become the benefactor and eponym of the Temple University Beasley School of Law. Smerconish became acquainted with Beasley while at HUD when he sought the latter's legal opinion for a possible defamation action against Steve Lopez, then a columnist with The Philadelphia Inquirer. Beasley was noted for his record-breaking defamation wins against the newspaper. (No lawsuit was filed by Smerconish against Lopez.) Working closely with Beasley for a decade, Smerconish specialized in complex tort litigation. At a 2015 legal seminar sponsored by the Pennsylvania Bar Institute, Smerconish wrote an essay summarizing some of his lessons learned working for Beasley.

Smerconish's legal work spanned various subject areas, including contracts, medical malpractice, and products liability. His clients included: the Philadelphia Fraternal Order of Police (in an action against Dead Kennedys for publishing an FOP photograph on an album cover that advocated the murder of police); the City of Rome, Italy (in a contract dispute against the Barnes Foundation); and Orlin Norris, a professional boxer who through Smerconish sued promoter Don King for a shot at the heavyweight title. In a medical malpractice action, Smerconish successfully sued abortion provider Kermit Gosnell. While in active practice, Smerconish served one term as a member of the Board of Directors of The Philadelphia Trial Lawyer's Association. Today, Smerconish's law license hangs in the office of the Philadelphia law firm Kline & Specter.

Media 
His media work grew out of his unique political experiences at an early age (working for Vice President Bush, running unsuccessfully for the state legislature, running campaigns for Arlen Specter and Frank Rizzo and ultimately being appointed to a sub-cabinet-level position by President George H.W. Bush). In the spring of 1990, Smerconish made his first radio appearance as a guest of a guest-host, Brian Tierney, who was then a substitute host on Philadelphia talk station 96.5 FM WWDB. During the 1991 Philadelphia mayoral election, Smerconish worked at WWDB as a political analyst. He then transitioned from a guest to a guest-host. By 1993, he had his own program Sunday nights from 8 p.m. until midnight, during which time his day job was the practice of law. In 1996, after the death of longtime broadcaster Dominic Quinn, Smerconish moved to Saturday and Sunday mornings, the latter of which allowed him to be the lead-in of Sid Mark's Sunday with Sinatra. WWDB was then sold by broadcast entrepreneurs Chuck and Susan Schwartz and a new owner began selling informercials masked as programming which Smerconish refused to honor. That led to his 1997 move to CBS affiliate WPHT (formerly known as WCAU AM). By the following year, he was moved to afternoon drive, all the while maintaining his practice of law. Only when in September 2003, after the firing of Don Imus, whose morning drive slot he took, did Smerconish become a talk show host who was a lawyer instead of a lawyer who was a talk show host.

He has received many accolades for his work as a broadcaster including Talkers Magazine consistently naming him one of America's most important talk show hosts, and Radio & Records naming him the nation's 2006 Local Personality of the Year. In 2003, he was named to "The Pennsylvania Report Power 75 List" of influential figures in Pennsylvania politics. The National Association of Broadcasters selected him as a 2011 Marconi Award finalist in the category of Best Network/Syndicated Host. He has often been the recipient of several Philadelphia Achievement in Radio awards, including Best Talk Show Host and Best Evening Program. Philadelphia Magazine named him the City's best talk show host in 2004, as well as one of the City's most powerful citizens.

In February 2009, Smerconish's program was placed into national syndication by Dial Global. On August 20, 2009, Smerconish became the first talk radio host to interview President Barack Obama live from the White House, one of seven radio conversations he's had with Obama. The interview was held in the Diplomatic Reception Room, where President Franklin D. Roosevelt conducted fireside chats. The President took questions from Smerconish and his listeners on a variety of subjects including the recent debates on the then-pending Affordable Care Act. He has also interviewed Presidents Jimmy Carter, George H. W. Bush, Bill Clinton and George W. Bush, as well as Vice Presidents Al Gore, Dick Cheney and Joe Biden. He has often said that he has spoken with everyone who interested him with the exception of the elusive creator of Seinfeld and Curb Your Enthusiasm, Larry David.

As a result of his increasing radio prominence, Smerconish was increasingly invited to appear on television, first locally and then nationally. In Philadelphia, he was first asked to appear by his friend and eventual mentor, Larry Kane, on WCAU Channel 10 providing election night analysis. He then became a regular on the local ABC affiliate (WPVI) program Inside Story, hosted by Marc Howard. And he often appeared as the guest of Lynn Doyle, host of Comcast's It's Your Call on CN8. CNN soon tapped Smerconish as a guest (and guest host) of Arthel Neville on the program TalkBack Live. CNN engaged Smerconish as a legal analyst and also utilized him as the substitute for Glenn Beck on CNN's Headline News. CNN briefly aired a program called Attorneys at Law featuring Smerconish, Jeffrey Toobin, and Lisa Bloom. When CNN switched to wall-to-wall coverage of the Iraq Invasion, the program was interrupted and never returned. Smerconish then moved to MSNBC as a contributor at the invitation of Phil Griffin, the future head of MSNBC, where he began guest hosting Scarborough Country in the absence of former Republican congressman Joe Scarborough. When in 2007, MSNBC fired Don Imus for a racial slur, it was Smerconish who was invited by the network to guest host Imus' time slot during the week of April 23–27 as a replacement on a trial basis. In-studio guests included Jon Anderson of Yes and former New York City Mayor Rudy Giuliani. MSNBC eventually hired Scarborough for the slot formerly held by Imus and rebranded the program as Morning Joe (where Smerconish has never been a guest). At MSNBC, Smerconish's role then became one of appearing daily with Tamron Hall, host of News Nation, and as a guest host of Hardball in the absence of Chris Matthews, a position he filled for five years. At the same time—despite the polarized media climate and differences between MSNBC and Fox News—he guest hosted The Radio Factor for Bill O'Reilly.

In 2013, Smerconish decided to give up his terrestrial radio platform then consisting of 80 radio stations across the country to move to the POTUS Channel 124 on Sirius XM Radio. He said at the time that this reflected his desire to be "nonpartisan" in discussing issues; having left the Republican party in 2010, adding that satellite radio would give him more freedom to talk politics without a party label.

Then, in early 2014, Smerconish left MSNBC after Jeff Zucker, president of CNN, invited him to host his own program there. Said Smerconish at the time, "The type of program I do on radio is far more in keeping with what CNN does on TV than it is with FOX or MSNBC." Smerconish broadcasts on CNN Saturdays at 9:00 am ET. The show also broadcast around the world by CNN International.

Smerconish has appeared on virtually every television program where politics is a staple, from Larry King Live to The View, from Real Time with Bill Maher to The Today Show, from The Colbert Report to The O'Reilly Factor.

He also writes a Sunday column in The Philadelphia Inquirer, and his work has been reprinted in newspapers nationwide, including The Washington Post, The Dallas Morning News, The Denver Post, Miami Herald, Boston Herald, Sacramento Bee, and Detroit News.

On June 5, 2020, rapper Meek Mill released his song "Otherside of America". Rolling Stone writes that Mill "paints a vivid picture of life on 'the other side of America.'" In the song's final seconds, Mill includes audio from a December 2018 interview with Smerconish during which the two discussed the need for criminal justice reform.

To mark his 30 years in talk radio, Smerconish aired an autobiographical film Things I Wish I Knew Before I Started Talking on Saturday, July 11, 2020 on CNN. In the film, Smerconish walks through his transition from a reliably Republican voter to a registered independent, illustrated by interview excerpts and anecdotes throughout his time in talk radio and television as a political commentator. He ultimately argues that the Republican party today does not resemble the one he joined in 1980, largely due to politicians taking cues from the media. The film was acquired by Virgil Films in October 2020 and aired on virtual cinemas on December 8, 2020. On June 15, 2021, the film debuted on Hulu.

Books 
Smerconish's work as a radio broadcaster was consumed by the events of 9/11 for years following 2001. While paying close attention to the hearings of the 9/11 Commission, Smerconish picked up on a question put to Secretary of State Condoleezza Rice by Commissioner John Lehman which suggested that political correctness played a role in airport security before and after 9/11. Smerconish subsequently interviewed Lehman whereupon Lehman shared the fact that testimony in front of the Commission suggested there was a limit on the number of Arab males who could be pulled out of line at any one time for secondary screening. Smerconish wrote about Lehman's account for his (then) column in the Philadelphia Daily News and stayed on the subject, eventually testifying before a Senate subcommittee at the invitation of Senator Arlen Specter. Ultimately, Smerconish wrote his first book, Flying Blind: How Political Correctness Continues to Compromise Airline Safety Post 9/11 (2004), about his investigation, and donated all proceeds to the Garden of Reflection, a 9/11 tribute garden in his native Bucks County, Pennsylvania.

His second book, a New York Times best-seller, was Muzzled: From T-Ball to Terrorism – True Stories That Should Be Fiction (2007), which sought to link the restraint of fighting the war on terror to domestic political correctness.

His third book, another New York Times best-seller, Murdered by Mumia: A Life Sentence of Loss, Pain, and Injustice (2007) (co-written by Maureen Faulkner) told the story of slain Philadelphia police officer Daniel Faulkner, in what was arguably the highest profile death penalty case in the world. Despite being convicted and sentenced to death by a Philadelphia jury for the murder of Faulkner, Mumia Abu-Jamal became a cause célèbre for death penalty opponents around the world. In print, Smerconish told Faulkner's story, and donated the $200,000 he was paid to write the book to a charitable fund established in the slain officer's name.

His fourth book, Morning Drive: Things I Wish I Knew Before I Started Talking (2009) detailed his evolving political positions against the backdrop of his talk radio career. Morning Drive's chapters were evenly split between issue-oriented essays and back-of-the-house media tales.

He then returned to the subject of 9/11 for his fifth book, Instinct: The Man Who Stopped the 20th Hijacker (2009), which tells the true story of Jose Melendez-Perez, a Customs and Border Protection Inspector at Orlando International Airport, who thwarted the entry of Mohammed al Qahtani, the 20th hijacker, one month before 9/11. Once again, Smerconish gave all author profits to charity, this time, the Flight 93 National Memorial in Shanksville, Pennsylvania. Smerconish subsequently sought to credit Melendez-Perez with playing a role in the killing of Osama bin Laden because he denied al Qahtani's entry and Qahtani, as a prisoner of war in Guantanamo Bay, was one of the detainees who identified bin Laden's courier, leading to the successful raid of SEAL Team Six.

Talk: A Novel (2014) is Smerconish's sixth book and first fictional work, about the life of conservative talk show host Stan Powers. Powers, a former slacker and stoner with no political knowledge, is nevertheless able to quickly ascend the talk radio world by his entertainment skills and recitation of red-meat talking points (which conflict with his own opinions). The more Stan Powers says on fictionalized radio station WRGT with which he personally disagrees, the higher he sees his star rising. With a Republican convention coming to his hometown of Tampa, Florida, will Powers continue to spout the lines that pay for his beach front condominium, or will he take the professional risk of being true to himself? Warner Horizon Television has optioned the rights to the novel.

Clowns to the Left of Me, Jokers to the Right (2018) is Smerconish's seventh book, a compilation of 100 of Smerconish's more memorable newspaper columns in The Philadelphia Inquirer and Philadelphia Daily News, each with a new Afterword, drawn from the 1,047 he published between 2001 and 2016. As characterized by Foreword Reviews: "Michael Smerconish's collection is compelling and entertaining—not as a filtering of daily news through a predictable ideological lens, but as a group of insightful entries into conversations about current events and issues….This sampling of Smerconish's columns exemplifies the kind of discourse, based on reason and evidence, that makes a newspaper, in print or online, indispensable to citizens of democracy." As characterized by The Daily Beast, "[The columns] make for enjoyable reading and remind us that journalism properly practiced requires a good deal of nerve, honesty, and insight, along with openness to dialogue and the determination not to live in a bubble." All author proceeds are being donated to the Children's Crisis Treatment Center, which provides social services to children in Philadelphia who are the victims of trauma.

After the release of Clowns, Smerconish composed a one-man show in which he draws on columns reprinted in the book and weaves them together with his explanation of the political divide. He has since toured the country in support of what he calls "American Life in Columns", appearing at the Paley Center in Los Angeles, Hobby Center in Houston, Rock and Roll Hall of Fame in Cleveland, Park Square Theatre in St. Paul, Sellersville Theatre outside of Philadelphia, the Crofoot Ballroom in Pontiac, Michigan, and at City Wineries located in Boston, Chicago, New York City, Atlanta and Nashville.

References

External links 
Smerconish's Home Page
CNN page for Smerconish
Smerconish's Soundcloud featuring cuts from The Michael Smerconish Program
Smerconish's Kline & Specter bio

American columnists
American political writers
American male writers
American social sciences writers
American talk radio hosts
Television anchors from Philadelphia
Writers from Philadelphia
Lehigh University alumni
People from Doylestown, Pennsylvania
American people of Montenegrin descent
American people of Rusyn descent
American people of Lemko descent
American people of Yugoslav descent
University of Pennsylvania Law School alumni
Living people
1962 births
CNN people